The 2005–06 Montana Grizzlies basketball team represented the University of Montana during the 2005–06 NCAA Division I men's basketball season. The Grizzlies, led by second-year head coach Larry Krystkowiak, played their home games at Dahlberg Arena and were members of the Big Sky Conference. They finished the season 24–7, 10–4 in Big Sky play to finish tied for second place in the conference regular season standings. Montana won the Big Sky Basketball tournament to earn the conference's automatic berth into the NCAA tournament. After upsetting No. 5 seed Nevada in the opening round, the Grizzlies lost to No. 4 seed Boston College.

Roster

Schedule and results

|-
!colspan=9 style=| Regular season

|-
!colspan=9 style=| 2006 Big Sky Tournament

|-
!colspan=9 style=| 2006 NCAA Tournament

References

Montana Grizzlies basketball seasons
Montana
Montana
Montana Grizzlies basketball
Montana Grizzlies basketball